Paul Hawkins is a London-based author and singer-songwriter who grew up near Bristol and has been a key figure in London's antifolk scene.  He regularly records in collaboration with Death in Vegas and Dot Allison guitarist Ian Button (also formerly of the Thrashing Doves) and a 6-piece band under the name of Paul Hawkins & The Awkward Silences. Hawkins has also worked with the artist Alex Templeton-Ward, utilising his bass and synth work both live and on record. 

His debut album The Misdiagnosis of Paul Hawkins was released on AFUK Records in 2006 (and was reissued as a digital download by free net label Fleeing from Pigeons in April 2009).  He first received UK national airplay on Radio 1 with his songs "I'll Be Getting a Divorce for Christmas" and his singles and tracks from the 2008 Jezus Factory Records album We Are Not Other People have also received Radio 1 and BBC 6 Music airplay. In October 2008 the band's first Radio 1 session was broadcast.  The band have appeared on compilations for Cherryade Records, Jezus Factory Records, Audio Antihero and AFUK Records.

They kicked off 2012 with Resonance FM's first live session of the year, debuting three new songs. 

In 2013, Hawkins' first book "Bad Santas and Other Creepy Christmas Characters" was published by Simon & Schuster UK.

Singles
 "The Evil Thoughts" (Split 7" with L'il Lost Lou) (Jezus Factory Records - 2007)
 "The Bigger Bone" (Jezus Factory Records - 2007)
 "I Believe in Karma" (Jezus Factory Records - 2008)
 "Don't Blind Me With Science" (Jezus Factory Records - 2008)
 "You Can't Make Somebody Love You" (Jezus Factory Records - 2008)
 "The Battle Is Over" (Jezus Factory Records - 2008)
 "Tonight I Will Be Santa" (Fika Recordings - 2011) as Paul Hawkins & The Bleak Midwinters
 "You Can't Make Somebody Love You / Of Course I Stole The Train" (Audio Antihero - 2011)

Albums/EPs
 The Misdiagnosis of Paul Hawkins (AFUK Records - 2006, digital reissue on Fleeing from Pigeons Records 2009)
 We Are Not Other People (Jezus Factory Records - 2008)
 Skinful of Silence (Fleeing from Pigeons Records - 2009)
 "Apologies To The Enlightenment (Jezus Factory Records - 2010)
 The Wrong Life EP (Audio Antihero - 2011)
 Dandelion Session EP (BarelyOut Recordings/Audio Antihero - 2012)

Compilation Tracks
 "I'll Be Getting a Divorce for Christmas" on A Very Cherry Christmas Volume 2 (Cherryade Records - 2006)
 "I Fell in Love With a Moment in Time" on Welcome Back to the Jezus Factory (Jezus Factory Records - 2007)
 "I Like It When You Call Me Doctor" on AFUK & I (AFUK Records - 2007)
 "I'll Take Good Care of You" on Bob Hope would (Audio Antihero - 2011)
 "I've Left The New World Order (stripped)" on Some.Alternate.Universe for FSID (Audio Antihero - 2012)
"Johnny (Dandelion Session)" on Into The Light: Volume Two for Pussy Riot (Unwashed Territories - 2012)
 "A Crappy Couple" on REGAL VS STEAMBOAT for Rape Crisis'' (Audio Antihero - 2013)

References

External links
 Official site
 Website of the UK antifolk scene
 http://www.timeout.com/london/features/1971.html - Time Out London article about the UK antifolk scene which talks about Paul Hawkins along with other artists
 indiefolkforever profile
 Official website
 Radio 1 session details
 Paul Hawkins interview part 1
 Paul Hawkins interview part 2
 Paul Hawkins interview for House of Tracks
 Fleeing from Pigeons Records
 

Year of birth missing (living people)
Living people
Outsider musicians
20th-century births